Schopfheim is a town in the district of Lörrach in Baden-Württemberg, Germany. It is situated on the river Wiese, 10 km north of Rheinfelden, and 13 km east of Lörrach.

The town is the birthplace of Gisela Oeri, Max Picard, and Arno Villringer.

Transport

Gallery

References

Lörrach (district)
Baden